Otiorhynchus vehemens is a species of broad-nosed weevils belonging to the family Curculionidae, subfamily Entiminae.

Description
They are black, with a wide greyish lateral band of fine hairs on the elytra and pronotum and longitudinal grooves on the surface of the elytra. Adults can be encountered from April through October.

Biology
These beetle are polyphagous. The soil-living larvae feed on the roots of many host plants, while the adults feed on leaves and have nocturnal habits.

Distribution
It is present in Italy and Switzerland.

Habitat

Bibliography
 Guido PEDRONI Biodiversità dei coleotteri Apionidi e Curculionidi in un settore di alta quota delle Alpi Orobie Occidentali Mus. Civ. Sc. Nat. "E. Caffi" - Bergamo
 F. Cianferoni Gli Invertebrati della Riserva Naturale Integrale di Sasso Fratino

References

External links
 Koleopterologie

Entiminae
Beetles of Europe
Beetles described in 1843